The Men's lightweight double sculls competition at the 2012 Summer Olympics in London took place are at Dorney Lake which, for the purposes of the Games venue, is officially termed Eton Dorney.

Schedule

All times are British Summer Time (UTC+1)

Results

Heats
First two of each heat qualify to the semifinals, remainder goes to the repechage.

Heat 1

Heat 2

Heat 3

Heat 4

Repechage
First two qualify to the semifinals.

Repechage 1

Repechage 2

Semifinals

Semifinals C/D
First three qualify to Final C, remainder to Final D.

Semifinal 1

Semifinal 2

Semifinals A/B
First three qualify to Final A, remainder to Final B.

Semifinal 1

Semifinal 2

Finals

Final D

Final C

Final B

Final A

References

Men's lightweight double sculls
Men's events at the 2012 Summer Olympics